Kendall Reusing (born 29 October 1997) is an American grappler and Brazilian jiu-jitsu competitor. A former freestyle wrestler, Reusing is a five time Brazilian jiu-jitsu world champion in colored belt and the 2019 No-Gi Jiu-Jitsu black belt World Champion.

Early career 
Kendall Marie Reusing was born on 29 October 1997 in Dana Point, California, the daughter of accomplished Brazilian jiu-jitsu competitor Tom Reusing. From a young age she trained in Judo, Jiu-jitsu and freestyle wrestling. As a teenager Reusing won the California State Wrestling Championship as well as 4 US National Wrestling Championships before joining Team USA .  In 2016 she returned to jiu-jitsu winning  numerous championships, winning double gold at the 2018 World No-Gi championship as a brown belt, before getting promoted to black belt in 2019.

Black belt career

2019
During her first year as black belt, Reusing won gold at the World No-Gi Championship and silver in the open-weight division; she then finished second at the UAEJJF Grand Slam L.A. before winning the SJJIF World Championship.

2020
Reusing represented Gracie Barra alongside Felipe Trovo and Carlos Souza in the team grappling event Subversiv 3 on August 28, 2020. Reusing defeated all four of her opponents at the event and Gracie Barra won the tournament. She was then invited to compete against Leah Taylor in the co-main event of Submission Underground 18 on October 4, 2020. Reusing won the match by submission in EBI overtime.

2021
On March 27, 2021, Reusing fought Nathiely de Jesus in the main event of Fight 2 Win 168, losing the match by submission. She then returned to team grappling as part of the Gracie Barra team at Subversiv 5 on May 1, 2021. Reusing won her match against Maggie Grindatti, but her teammates both lost and Gracie Barra were eliminated in the opening round. Reusing fought Talita Nogueira in the co-main event of Fight 2 Win 173 on June 11, 2021 and won the match by submission with a choke. She returned at Fight 2 Win 177 on July 16, 2021 and fought Maria Malyjasiak in the co-main event, losing by submission.

In October 2021 Reusing won the Inaugural Polaris Women's Openweight championship by defeating Venla Luukkonen via Submission, the following month she won the ADCC East Coast trials in the 60 kg+ division. Although victory at this trial did not guarantee an invite to the 2022 ADCC World Championship, Reusing was given an invite to the event as a result of her performance. She was also invited to compete in the Heavyweight division at the Who's Number One Championships on September 25 and 26, 2021. Reusing won her first two matches but lost to Rafaela Guedes in the final, taking second place at the tournament. During Worlds 2021 she did not compete but served as a commentator for FloSports. At the Pan-American No-Gi Championship, she won gold in her division and silver in the open-weight division.

2022
Reusing was invited to compete against Ffion Davies for the inaugural women's openweight title in the co-main event of Grapplefest 11 on February 26, 2022. She won the match by decision and became the promotion's first openweight champion. Reusing was then booked to defend her Polaris title against Amanda Leve at Polaris 19 on March 26, 2022. She retained the title after her opponent Leve forfeited due to an injury. 

At the 2022 ADCC World Championship Reusing dominated her first match against Giovana Jara then got a knee injury following a takedown in the semi-final, retiring from the match. Reusing would have been eligible to compete for the bronze medal, but was unable to do so due to the injury she sustained in the previous match and had to forfeit.

Brazilian Jiu-Jitsu competitive summary 
Main Achievements at black belt level:
IBJJF World Champion NoGi (2019)
2nd Place IBJJF World Championship NoGi (2019)
IBJJF Pan Champion NoGi (2021)
2nd place IBJJF Pan Champion NoGi (2021)
SJJIF World Champion (2019)
2nd place UAEJJF Grand Slam, LA (2019)

Main Achievements (Coloured Belts):
2x IBJJF World Champion NoGi (2018 brown)
IBJJF World Champion (2017 purple)
2x IBJJF World Champion NoGi (2016 blue)
UAEJJF Abu Dhabi Pro Champion (2018 purple)
2nd place IBJJF World Championship (2017 purple)
2nd place IBJJF Pans Championship (2018 brown)
2nd place UAEJJF Grand Slam, LA (2018 brown)
3rd place IBJJF Pans Championship (2018 brown)

Instructor lineage 
Helio Gracie > Carlos Gracie Jr. > Nelson Monteiro > Tom Reusing > Kendall Reusing

Notes

References 

American practitioners of Brazilian jiu-jitsu
Living people
1995 births
People awarded a black belt in Brazilian jiu-jitsu
World No-Gi Brazilian Jiu-Jitsu Championship medalists
Female Brazilian jiu-jitsu practitioners
American submission wrestlers